The 2017 Iraqi Super Cup was the 8th edition of the Iraqi Super Cup, and the first since the competition's name was changed from Iraqi Perseverance Cup to Iraqi Super Cup. The match was contested between the Baghdad rivals, Al-Zawraa and Al-Quwa Al-Jawiya, at Karbalaa International Stadium in Karbalaa. It was played on 17 November 2017 as a curtain-raiser to the 2017–18 season. Al-Quwa Al-Jawiya made their 5th appearance in the Super Cup while Al-Zawraa extended their record to 6 appearances. Al-Zawraa won the cup on penalties for the club's 4th title, a record.

Before the game, the Iraq Football Association decided that if the final was to finish as a draw after 90 minutes, the match would go straight to a penalty shootout, with no extra-time played. This turned out to be the case due to the last-minute Al-Zawraa equalising goal from Ali Rehema.

Pre-match
Iraq international goalkeeper Wissam Gassid, who played for both clubs, had a retirement ceremony before kick-off.

Match

Details

References

External links
 Iraq Football Association

Football competitions in Iraq
Iraqi Super Cup
Iraq
November 2017 sports events in Iraq
2017–18 in Iraqi football